Iolaus kelle is a butterfly in the family Lycaenidae. It is found in the Republic of the Congo.

References

Butterflies described in 1967
Iolaus (butterfly)
Endemic fauna of the Republic of the Congo
Butterflies of Africa